Sarit Shenar (born ) is an Israeli football midfielder, currently playing in the Israeli First League for ASA Tel Aviv University. She had also played for in the U.S., Germany and Denmark. She had played in the Champions League with Maccabi Holon and ASA Tel Aviv, and she has been a member of the Israeli national team since 2000, when she made her debut against Belarus.

Club career
Shenar started playing with a boys’ team in Kiryat Gat, but was barred from playing upon reaching 12. At the age of 15 she had joined the newly formed Hapoel Ashkelon, and moved shortly afterwards to ASA Tel Aviv University. In 2003, after completing her military service, Shenar began attending West Texas A&M University, where she played for the Lady Buffs  for the next four years, scoring 72 goals. During the same period Shenar also played for Maccabi Holon in the UEFA Women's Champions League

Shenar played with the Lady Buffs until 2007, after which she applied for positions with a host of European clubs, finally signing with Hamburger SV, with whom she played for a year. The following season Shenar signed with SønderjyskE, where she played until January 2009, netting four goals, before she decided to return to Israel due to her mother’s illness. Shenar transferred to ASA Tel Aviv University, with which she played ever since, winning 5 Israeli championships and 3 cups, as well as twice being the league’s top scorer.

Management career
In 2013, Shenar founded, together with Shelly Israel a women’s football team, Bnot Netanya, and Shenar served as head coach for the team for the 2013–14 season,

International career
Shenar made her international debut in the Israel women's national football team at the age of 14, in a match against Belarus. In total, Shenar played 39 matches for the national team and is the most capped in the team. Shenar scored 14 matches for the national team and is the team’s second best scorer, after Silvi Jan.
 
Shenar also played for the U-19 national team, making 6 appearances in 2001, during the 2002 UEFA Women's Under-19 Championship qualifying campaign. Shenar scored 6 goals in the campaign, and is the U-19 team top scorer.

Honours
Championships (5):
 2009–10, 2010–11, 2011–12, 2012–13, 2013–14
Cup (3):
 2010–11, 2011–12, 2013–14

Individual
Top Goalscorer (Israeli Women's League)(2):
2012–13 (35 goals)
2013–14 (28 goals)

References

External links

Club Position Details – Sarit Shenar Israeli Football Association 

1983 births
Israeli Jews
Living people
Israeli women's footballers
Israel women's international footballers
Expatriate women's soccer players in the United States
Expatriate women's footballers in Germany
Expatriate women's footballers in Denmark
West Texas A&M University alumni
Hapoel Ashkelon F.C. (women) players
ASA Tel Aviv University players
Maccabi Holon F.C. (women) players
Women's association football midfielders
People from Southern District (Israel)